The ash-throated antwren (Herpsilochmus parkeri) is an insectivorous bird in the antbird family, Thamnophilidae.

It was described as a new species in 1986. The first specimens had been collected in northern Peru in 1983.

It is considered to be part of the group within the genus that also contains H. pileatus, H. atricapillus, and H. motacilloides.

It is found in humid upper tropical and subtropical forest in the eastern Andes of northern Peru.

References

External links
BirdLife Species Factsheet.

ash-throated antwren
Birds of the Peruvian Andes
Endemic birds of Peru
ash-throated antwren